The College Concert is a live album by American jazz clarinetist Pee Wee Russell and trumpeter Red Allen featuring a performance recorded at the Massachusetts Institute of Technology in 1966 for the Impulse! label. The album would be the final recording for Allen and the penultimate release by Russell.

Reception
The Allmusic review by Scott Yanow awarded the album 4 stars stating "The music is generally relaxed with an emphasis on blues".

Track listing
All compositions by Pee Wee Russell except as indicated
 "Blue Monk" (Thelonious Monk) - 5:49   
 "I Want a Little Girl" (Murray Mencher, Billy Moll) - 6:00   
 "Body and Soul" (Edward Heyman, Johnny Green, Robert Sour, Frank Eyton) - 4:15   
 "Pee Wee's Blues" - 4:08   
 "2° East, 3° West" (John Lewis) - 3:59   
 "Graduation Blues" - 6:35   
Recorded at the Massachusetts Institute of Technology in Cambridge, Massachusetts on April 17, 1966

Personnel
Pee Wee Russell - clarinet
Red Allen - trumpet, vocals
Steve Kuhn - piano
Charlie Haden - bass
Marty Morell - drums

References

Impulse! Records live albums
Pee Wee Russell live albums
Red Allen live albums
1967 live albums